Nevytske Castle is a semi-ruined castle in Zakarpattia Oblast, Ukraine. 

This location of the castle gave it a good opportunity to control the Transcarpathian route over the Uzhok pass (Bieszczady Mountains).

The castle was first mentioned in 1274 belonging to the King of Hungary Laszlo IV as a dungeon or a keep. Completely rebuilt in the early 15th century, it, towering over the Uzh River, was the mighty citadel of the Drugeth family which supervised its continuous modernisation over the centuries. The keep, rebuilt in its present form in the early 16th century, passed from hand to hand during the internecine strife that convulsed Hungary in the early 17th century.

In 1644, Prince of Transylvania George II Rákóczi ruined the castle, leaving it much as it stands today. A decline in defensive importance of the site as well as the remote and inaccessible situation of the castle have preserved it from complete demolition.

Near the site is located an Uzhhorod Military Training Center.

Parts of the castle (the roof of a dungeon) collapsed in March 2019. Early 2021 Nevytske Castle was partly reconstructed.

References

Sources 
 Памятники градостроительства и архитектуры Украинской ССР. Киев: Будивельник, 1983–1986. Том 2, с. 200.

External links

 Nevytsky Castle at the Encyclopedia of History of Ukraine
 [https://www.youtube.com/watch?v=WMO-8Ug_tNA Річка Уж та привиди Невицького замку (Uzh River, ghosts and Nevytsky Castle [ VIRTUAL GUID]]) (video) on YouTube (2013)

Castles in Ukraine
Buildings and structures in Zakarpattia Oblast
Ruined castles in Ukraine
Uzhhorod Raion